Sphaerodactylus mariguanae,  also known as the southern Bahamas sphaero or Mayaguana least gecko, is a species of lizard in the family Sphaerodactylidae . It is endemic to Mayaguana and Booby Cay in the Bahamas.

References

Sphaerodactylus
Reptiles of the Bahamas
Endemic fauna of the Bahamas
Reptiles described in 1934